Burke County is a county located along the eastern border of the U.S. state of Georgia in the Piedmont. As of the 2020 census, the population was 24,596. The county seat is Waynesboro.

Burke County is part of the Augusta-Richmond County, GA-SC Metropolitan Statistical Area.

History 
Burke County is an original county of Georgia, created February 5, 1777, and named for English political writer, Edmund Burke, a Member of Parliament in the Whig Party who favored conciliation with the colonies. In 1779, Col. John Twiggs and brothers Col. William Few and Benjamin Few, along with 250 men, defeated British in the Battle of Burke Jail.

Burke County is located within the CSRA (the Central Savannah River Area). During the antebellum period, it was developed by slave labor for large cotton plantations. The county was majority African American in population in this period, as slaveholders wanted high numbers of slaves for laborers to cultivate and process cotton.

The military tradition continued during the American Civil War, when Burke County provided volunteers for numerous units: the 2nd Regiment Georgia Infantry Company D (Burke Sharpshooters), 3rd Regiment Georgia Infantry Company A (Burke Guards), 32nd Regiment Georgia Infantry Company C (Williams Volunteers), 32nd Regiment Georgia Infantry Company K (Alexander Greys), 48th Regiment Georgia Infantry Company D (Burke Volunteers), Cobb's Legion Infantry company E (Poythress Volunteers), and the Cobb's Legion Cavalry Company F (Grubb's Hussars).

Agriculture continued as the basis of the economy for decades after the American Civil War, when most freedmen worked as sharecroppers or tenant farmers. Cotton was the major commodity crop. In the early 20th century, mechanization of agriculture caused many African-American farm workers to lose their jobs.

As can be seen from the census tables below, the county lost population from 1910 to 1920, and from 1930 to 1970. Part of the decline was related to the Great Migration, as millions of African Americans left the rural South and Jim Crow oppression for jobs and opportunities in industrial cities of the Midwest, North. From World War II on, primary migration destinations were West Coast cities because of the buildup of the defense industry. In addition, whites left rural areas for industrial jobs in the North, in cities such as Chicago and Detroit.

Geography 
It is the second-largest county by area in Georgia.

The southern half of Burke County, defined by a line running along State Route 80 to Waynesboro, then southeast  to east of Perkins, is located in the Upper Ogeechee River sub-basin of the Ogeechee River basin.  North of Waynesboro, and bordered on the north by a line running from Keysville southeast to Girard, the territory is part of the Brier Creek sub-basin of the Savannah River basin. The most northern sliver of Burke County is located in the Middle Savannah River sub-basin of the same Savannah River basin.

Major highways 

  U.S. Route 25
  U.S. Route 25 Bypass
  State Route 17
  State Route 23
  State Route 24
  State Route 56
  State Route 56 Spur
  State Route 78
  State Route 80
  State Route 88
  State Route 121
  State Route 121 Bypass
  State Route 305
  Savannah River Parkway

Adjacent counties 

 Richmond County (north)
 Aiken County, South Carolina (northeast)
 Barnwell County, South Carolina (east-northeast)
 Allendale County, South Carolina (east)
 Screven County (southeast)
 Jenkins County (south)
 Emanuel County (southwest)
 Jefferson County (west)

Demographics

2020 census

As of the 2020 United States census, there were 24,596 people, 8,193 households, and 5,939 families residing in the county.

2010 census
As of the 2010 United States Census, there were 23,316 people, 8,533 households, and 6,110 families living in the county.
As of the 2010 United States Census, there were 23,316 people living in the county. 49.5% were Black or African American, 47.5% White, 0.3% Asian, 0.2% Native American, 0.1% Pacific Islander, 1.1% from some other race and 1.3% from two or more races. 2.6% were Hispanic or Latino (of any race).

In terms of ancestry, 49.5% have some African ancestry, 11.0% identify as of American, 9.3% are Irish, 5.5% were English, and 5.1% were German.

Of the 8,533 households, 39.0% had children under the age of 18 living with them, 42.4% were married couples living together, 24.1% had a female householder with no husband present, 28.4% were non-families, and 24.3% of all households were made up of individuals. The average household size was 2.70 and the average family size was 3.20. The median age was 35.9 years.

The median income for a household in the county was $33,155 and the median income for a family was $41,659. Males had a median income of $37,061 versus $24,952 for females. The per capita income for the county was $15,934. About 20.0% of families and 25.7% of the population were below the poverty line, including 38.0% of those under age 18 and 16.2% of those age 65 or over.

2000 census
As of the census of 2000, there were 22,243 people, 7,934 households, and 5,799 families living in the county. There were 8,842 housing units at an average density of 11 per square mile (4/km2). The racial makeup of the county was 51.0% Black or African American, 46.9% White,  0.2% Native American, 0.3% Asian, 0.01% Pacific Islander, 0.6% from other races, and 1.0% from two or more races.  1.4% of the population were Hispanic or Latino of any race.

There were 7,934 households, out of which 38.40% had children under the age of 18 living with them, 45.40% were married couples living together, 22.80% had a female householder with no husband present, and 26.90% were non-families. 23.60% of all households were made up of individuals, and 9.50% had someone living alone who was 65 years of age or older.  The average household size was 2.77 and the average family size was 3.27.

In the county, the population was spread out, with 31.30% under the age of 18, 9.10% from 18 to 24, 27.30% from 25 to 44, 21.40% from 45 to 64, and 10.90% who were 65 years of age or older.  The median age was 33 years. For every 100 females, there were 90.30 males.  For every 100 females age 18 and over, there were 84.60 males.

The median income for a household in the county was $27,877, and the median income for a family was $31,660. Males had a median income of $29,992 and females had an income of $19,008. The per capita income for the county was $13,136.  About 23.80% of families and 28.70% of the population were below the poverty line, including 39.00% of those under age 18 and 29.80% of those age 65 or over.

Education

Communities

Cities
 Midville
 Sardis
 Vidette
 Waynesboro (county seat)

Towns
 Girard
 Keysville

Unincorporated communities
 Drone
 Gough

Politics
Burke County was traditionally a swing county in federal politics, voting for the winner in every presidential election from 1984 and 2012 except 2000 (when Republican George W. Bush won the presidency while losing the county to Democrat Al Gore). However, the county has not voted for a winning candidate since; it supported Democrat Hillary Clinton in 2016 and Republican Donald Trump in 2020, despite both candidates losing the state of Georgia and the electoral college.

See also 

 Central Savannah River Area
 National Register of Historic Places listings in Burke County, Georgia
List of counties in Georgia

References

External links
 Albert M. Hillhouse. A History of Burke County, Georgia, 1777-1950. Reprint Company and Magnolia Press, 1985.
 Burke County Official Website
 Edmund Burke Academy
 Burke County Chamber of Commerce
 Burke County historical marker
 Botsford Church historical marker

 
1777 establishments in Georgia (U.S. state)
Populated places established in 1777
Georgia (U.S. state) counties
Augusta metropolitan area
Majority-minority counties in Georgia